Random Thoughts is an album by American jazz pianist Don Pullen, recorded in 1990 for the Blue Note label.

Reception
The Austin American-Statesman wrote that "Pullen's characteristic linear logic method of soloing keeps even the most experimental musical excursions in line."

The AllMusic review by Richard S. Ginell stated: "As bent upon pianistic mayhem as Don Pullen often seemed, this was one of his more user-friendly discs, despite having only a bass and drums between himself and tender-eared listeners. Quite often, Pullen starts a piece as if it were a conventional piano trio number, but before long, he's piling up his trademark keyboard-shuffling glissandos, playing the instrument as if it was a big, glittering, percussive crashing board. Yet everything always swings.. Pullen manages to make even fearsome things seem approachable."

Track listing
All compositions by Don Pullen
 "Andre's Ups and Downs" – 5:19 
 "Random Thoughts" – 9:05
 "Indio Gitano" – 9:39 
 "The Dancer" – 5:58 
 "Endangeried Species: African American Youth" – 7:36
 "626 Fairfax" – 6:40 
 "Ode To Life" – 8:39
Recorded in New York City on March 23, 1990

Personnel
Don Pullen – piano
James Genus – bass
Lewis Nash – drums

References

Don Pullen albums
1990 albums
Blue Note Records albums